Evoplosoma is a genus of deep-sea sea star in the family Goniasteridae.

Description and characteristics 
These sea stars are typical five-armed starfish with a sizable disc in the middle. The majority of the species in this genus are found in deep waters, where they appear to prey on other cnidarians and deep sea coral.

List of species
According to the World Register of Marine Species:
 Evoplosoma augusti Koehler, 1909
 Evoplosoma claguei Mah, Nizinski & Lundsten, 2010
 Evoplosoma forcipifera Fisher, 1906
 Evoplosoma scorpio Downey, 1981
 Evoplosoma tasmanica (McKnight, 2006)
 Evoplosoma timorensis Aziz & Jangoux, 1985
 Evoplosoma virgo Downey, 1982
 Evoplosoma voratus Mah, Nizinski & Lundsten, 2010
 Evoplosoma watlingi Mah, 2015

References

External links